Stensons is a Swedish dansband from Skåne that started performing as an independent all-male band starting 2005. 

From 2000 to 2005, the band had been working as a backup musical band for Swedish singer Christina Lindberg under the name Christina Lindbergs orkester in addition to releasing albums in their own name and touring various Scandinavian countries. When Lindberg became pregnant and wanted to put her musical career on hold, the band decided to continue under the new name Stensons, after Kalle Stenson, the guitarist / saxophonist of the band.

Members
Kalle Stenson - guitar, saxophone
Pär Hogland - bass
Niclas Lindström - drums
Tommy Kjellqvist - vocals, guitar
Roger Olsson - keyboards, accordion, vocals
John Martin Bengtsson - vocals

Discography

Albums

References

External links
Official website
Facebook

Dansbands
Atenzia Records artists